Lajos Deák Ébner (18 July 1850, Pest, Austrian Empire–20 January 1934, Budapest, Kingdom of Hungary) was a Hungarian painter.

Life
He studied in Munich and Paris, where he joined his fellow painters László Paál and Mihály Munkácsy and came under the influence of the Barbizon school. After 1874, he spent his summers at the Szolnok art colony.

Many of his paintings are realistic portrayals of life around Szolnok. From 1887 to 1922, he was head of the "Budapest School of Painting for Women" (Budapesti Női Festőiskola). In 1890, he and Károly Lotz painted frescoes at Tihany Abbey. From 1895 to 1899 he executed more frescoes at the Kunsthalle Budapest.

Selected paintings

References

External links

1850 births
1934 deaths
People from Pest, Hungary
19th-century Hungarian painters
20th-century Hungarian painters
Hungarian male painters
19th-century Hungarian male artists
20th-century Hungarian male artists